Dreyers Fond (English: The Dreyer Foundation) is a Copenhagen based Danish foundation founded by husband-and wife Thorvald and Margot Dreyer in 1976. Thorvald Dreyer was an architect. Margot Dreyer was a lawyer. The foundation supports projects and activities aimed at promoting the development of the architects’ and lawyers’ professions and their interaction with society. The annual Dreyer Honorary Award honors excellence in architecture as well as law. The foundation is also active in the market for real estate investments.

Real estate portfolio

Løvenborg
Dreyers Fond is based in the Løvenborg building on Vesterbrogade in Copenhagen. The building is from 1906 and was designed by Anton Rosen. Dreyers Fond acquired the building in 2000 and subsequently undertook a renovation which received the Europa Nostra Award in 2004.

Vesterbrogade 32: Valencia Building
In September 2012, Dreyers Fond acquired the building at Vesterbrogade 32 in the Vesterbro district of Copenhagen. It first opened in 1858 to design by H. S. Stilling under the name Thors Ølhal but later developed into the largest cabaret in the Nordic region under the name Valencia. The complex has been renovated by Dorte Mandrup Architects and now houses the Association of Danish Law Firms..

Højbro Plads 3: Warburg House
In October 2012, Dreyers Fond acquired the listed Warburg House on Højbro Plads in central Copenhagen. The 1,112 building dates from. It contains the coffee chain Baresso's first coffee bar and other tenants include Toga Vinstue and a cocktail bar.

Fælledvej 19
In 2014, Dreyers Fond acquired two buildings on Fælledvej at No. 19 in the Nørrebro district of Copenhagen consists of a residential building on the street dating from 1858 as well as an industrial building from 1908 in the courtyard. In 2015, Holscher Nordberg Architects completed a renovation of the industrial building which now contains 6 apartments.

Dreyer Honorary Award recipients

Architecture

References

External links
 Official website

Foundations based in Denmark
1976 establishments in Denmark